The Provincial Congresses were extra-legal legislative bodies established in ten of the Thirteen Colonies early in the American Revolution. Some were referred to as congresses while others used different terms for a similar type body. These bodies were generally renamed or replaced with other bodies when the provinces declared themselves states.

Overview 
Colonial government in America was a system of governance modeled after the British government of the time, with the king corresponding to the governor, the House of Commons to the colonial assembly, and the House of Lords to the governor's council. Colonial assemblies did not believe that the British Parliament had authority over them to impose taxes (or certain other laws), that it was the colonial assembly’s duty to decide what should be imposed on their fellow colonists (the Massachusetts Circular Letter was an example of that argument). Legally, the crown governor's authority was unassailable, but assemblies began to resist efforts by some governors and royal officials to enforce acts of Parliament or to raise local taxes that governors demanded. In resisting that authority, assemblies resorted to arguments based upon natural rights and the common welfare, giving life to the notion that governments derived, or ought to derive, their authority from the consent of the governed.

Committees of correspondence were formed as shadow governments in the Thirteen colonies prior to the American Revolution. During the First Continental Congress (in 1774), committees of inspection were formed to enforce the Continental Association trade boycott with Britain in response to the British Parliament’s Intolerable Acts. By 1775, the committees had become counter-governments that gradually replaced royal authority and took control of local governments. Known as the Committees of Safety, they regulated the economy, politics, morality, and militia of their individual communities. After the British Proclamation of Rebellion and the King’s speech before Parliament (27 October 1775) the colonies moved towards independence. 

Provisional governments began to create new state constitutions and governments. Committees of safety were a later outcome of the committees of correspondence. Committees of safety were executive bodies that governed during adjournments of, were created by, and derived their authority from provincial assemblies or congresses. 

In some colonies there were little or no changes to their assemblies until statehood. They had no need of a provisional legislative body since their governors did not dissolve or prevent the legislative assemblies from meeting. This was the case in the Charter colonies with more autonomy, such as Connecticut and Rhode Island, which elected colonial governors who were aligned with their assemblies. (Connecticut Governor Jonathan Trumbull and Rhode Island Governor Nicholas Cooke served as both the last colonial governors and first state governors.) The Delaware Colony was a proprietary colony under Governor John Penn of the Province of Pennsylvania, which included the “Lower Counties of the Delaware", but it maintained a separate Delaware assembly. It was generally allowed more independence of action in their colonial assembly than in other colonies.

List of Provincial Congresses and Bodies

Massachusetts Provincial Congress 
New York Provincial Congress
Provincial Congress of New Jersey
Pennsylvania Provincial Conference
North Carolina Provincial Congress

See also
 Colonial government in the Thirteen Colonies
 Continental Congress

References 

American Revolution